Tú y Yo may refer to:

Tú y yo (TV series), 1996 Mexican telenovela produced by Emilio Larrosa
Tú y Yo (David Bisbal album), 2014 album
Tú y Yo (Marcos Witt album), 1991 album
"Tú y Yo" (Raymix and Paulina Rubio song), 2020
"Tú y Yo" (Thalía song), 2002
"Tú y Yo", a 1992 song by Ana Gabriel from the album Silueta
"Tu y Yo", a 2019 song by Anitta from the album Kisses
"Tú y Yo", a 1993 song by Luis Miguel from the album Aries
"Tú y Yo", a 2010 song by Enrique Iglesias from the album Euphoria
"Tú y Yo", a 2010 song by Prince Royce from the album Prince Royce
"Tu y Yo", a 2012 song by Lylloo & Matt Houston
"Tú y Yo", a 2013 song by Maite Perroni from the album Eclipse de Luna

See also
You and I (disambiguation)
You and Me (disambiguation)